The First Battle of Oranik took place during the Albanian-Venetian War of 1447-1448, when the Republic of Venice allied with the Ottoman Empire against the League of Lezhë. The Albanian forces defeated the Ottoman army led by Mustafa Pasha during the battle and two months later peace was established between Albania and Venice.

Background

In 1447, Skanderbeg had gone to war with Venice. The Venetians had been using diplomatic tactics to weaken Skanderbeg's influence and power: they had been trying to convince the Ottomans to launch an incursion into Albania. The Ottomans, who had been besieging Svetigrad, could not peel away their forces to fight in the Albanian interior: Svetigrad blocked their way and Skanderbeg's army was camped nearby. Once the fortress had fallen, however, they could afford to send troops into Albania.

Prelude and the battle
Mustafa, after gathering his army, invaded Albania through upper Dibra. A guarding force was left under the command of Vrana Konti which was united by Skanderbeg's forces after leaving 5,000 troops to watch Dagno. The forces consisted of 15,000 Ottoman troops and 6,000 Albanian troops. The armies met and a battle between two champions took place with the Albanian champion winning. The armies engaged, but higher Albanian morale forced the Ottoman army to retreat. The Albanians chased the Ottomans, capturing Mustafa Pasha.

Aftermath
Mustafa Pasha had lost 3,000 men as well as being captured including twelve high officers. Skanderbeg learned from these officers that it was the Venetians who pushed the Ottomans to invade Albania. The Venetians, upon hearing of the defeat, urged to establish peace. Mustafa Pasha was soon ransomed for 25,000 ducats to the Ottomans.

References and notes

External sources

Warfare by Skanderbeg
1448 in Europe
Oranik
Oranik
Conflicts in 1448
1448 in the Ottoman Empire